The Mountain Home micropolitan area may refer to:

The Mountain Home, Arkansas micropolitan area, United States
The Mountain Home, Idaho micropolitan area, United States

See also
Mountain Home (disambiguation)